The Andrew Gildersleeve Octagonal Building, also known as Mattituck, the Octagon House and Mattituck Octagon House is an historic octagon house located at Main Road (NY 25) and Love Lane in Mattituck, New York. It was built in 1854 by Andrew Gildersleeve, a master carpenter, who used it for his family home as well as for a store.

On August 19, 1976, it was added to the National Register of Historic Places.

References

External links
 Mattituck-Laurel Historical Society and Museums
 Newsday (Long Island), A Land of History: East End sites listed on the National Register of Historic Places

Commercial buildings on the National Register of Historic Places in New York (state)
Octagon houses in New York (state)
Southold, New York
Houses on the National Register of Historic Places in New York (state)
Houses in Suffolk County, New York
National Register of Historic Places in Suffolk County, New York
1854 establishments in New York (state)
Houses completed in 1854